Indoor hockey at the 2007 Asian Indoor Games was held in Macau, China from 26 October to 3 November 2007.

Medalists

Results

Preliminary

Final round

Classification 5th–6th

Bronze medal match

Gold medal match

References
 2007 Asian Indoor Games official website

2007 Asian Indoor Games events
Asian Indoor Games
2007